Karen Simonyan (born 3 October 1988), is an Armenian politician, Member of the National Assembly of Armenia of Bright Armenia's faction.

References 

1988 births
Living people
21st-century Armenian politicians
Bright Armenia politicians
People from Vanadzor